Olimpia Cavalli (30 August 1930 – 29 March 2012) was an Italian actress.

Born in Cadeo, she was mainly active between the late fifties and mid-sixties. After being a star on avanspettacolo alongside Erminio Macario, she made her film debut in 1959 in the comedy La cambiale by Camillo Mastrocinque. After a number of films, including Roberto Rossellini's Vanina Vanini, Dino Risi's The Thursday, Sergio Corbucci's The Two Marshals and Ugo Tognazzi's His Women, in 1966 she married and retired from showbusiness. After a long hiatus, she resumed her activities in 1999, to star in the film L'ultimo volo.

Filmography

References

External links 
 

Italian film actresses
1930 births
People from the Province of Piacenza
2012 deaths
20th-century Italian actresses
Italian stage actresses